Carl Anthony (born February 8, 1939) is an American architect, regional planner, social justice activist, and author. He is the founder and co-director of Breakthrough Communities, a project dedicated to building multiracial leadership for sustainable communities in California and the rest of the nation. He is the former President of the Earth Island Institute, and is the co-founder and former executive director of its urban habitat program, one of the first environmental justice organizations to address race and class issues.

Early life 

Carl Anthony was born in a predominantly African American neighborhood in Philadelphia, Pennsylvania, known as Black Bottom. His parents, Lewis Anthony (born William Edwards) and Mildred Anthony (née Cokine), sent Carl and his older brother Lewie to B.B. Comegys, an integrated elementary school in which only about a dozen of the 300 students were African American, rather than the segregated school called Woodrow Wilson, which was only a block away from their home. They later went on to attend Dobbins Vocational School, where Anthony was enrolled in the carpentry and cabinet-making shop. His teachers were impressed by his drawings and suggested that he transfer to the architectural drafting homeroom, where he fostered his interest in architecture.

Education 
Anthony graduated from Columbia University Graduate School of Architecture, Planning, and Preservation in 1969. Upon his graduation, he was awarded the William Kinne Fellowship, a grant to enrich students’ education through travel. Anthony visited traditional towns and villages in West Africa, studying the ways in which people utilized their few resources to shape their environments.

Early Career: Architect’s Renewal Committee and UC Berkeley 
Anthony began his professional career in the late 1960s at the Architect's Renewal Committee in Harlem, one of the first community design centers in the United States. Upon his return to the United States from West Africa in 1971, he relocated to California and taught at the University of California, Berkeley as an assistant professor of architecture in the College of Environmental Design, later becoming a faculty member of the university's College of Natural Resources. In 1980 he left UC-Berkeley to work as an architect and urban planner.

Urban Habitat (1989–2000) 
Anthony served as President of Earth Island Institute from 1991 to 1998. During this time, in spring 1996, he was an appointed Fellow at the Institute of Politics, housed within the John F. Kennedy School of Government, at Harvard University. Alongside his colleague Luke Cole at the California Rural Legal Assistance Foundation, Anthony founded and published the Race, Poverty, and the Environmental Journal, which was the United States’ first environmental justice periodical. In 1989, Anthony founded Earth Island Institute's Urban Habitat Program, the mission of which is to combine education with advocacy and coalition building to advance environmental and social justice in low-income communities in the Bay Area, with David Bower and Karl Linn, and he served as the initiative's Executive Director until 2000. Anthony directed various projects of Urban Habitat:
 Bay Area Justice and Sustainability Project: developed and promoted a regional agenda for justice and sustainability while addressing planning policies that lead to inner city abandonment.
 Leadership Institute for Sustainable Communities: leadership training program for land use policies and practices.
 Transportation and Environmental Justice Project: advocated for changing the priorities of the Metropolitan Transportation Commission (MTC) and the Bay Area Air Quality Management District toward addressing the transit needs of low-income communities of color.
 Brownfields Community Leadership Project: worked with leaders of low-income communities of color in the Bay Area to ensure Brownfields redevelopment addressed their needs.
 Hunter's Point Environmental Health Project: trained residents and community leaders in Bayview Hunter's Point in environmental health, justice issues, and laws. Partnership with the Southeast Alliance for Environmental Justice and Golden Gate University Environmental Law and Justice Clinic.
 Parks and Open Space for All People: worked toward revitalizing San Francisco Parks System by focusing on the needs of low-income communities of color, ensuring that a diverse range of people could have access to the parks.

Ford Foundation (2000–2008) 
In 2000, Anthony joined the Ford Foundation. There, he served as acting director of the Community and Resource Development Unit. He was also Director of the Sustainable Metropolitan Communities Initiative for seven years, and funded the Conversation of Regional Equity, a dialogue between policy analysts and advocates concerning racial justice and sustainability.

Breakthrough Communities (2008–) 
In 2008, Anthony co-founded Breakthrough Communities, a project of Earth House Center, an advocacy nonprofit for regional equity and environmental and climate justice and is serving as the co-director. Anthony founded Six Wins, an initiative in the Bay Area addressing the mitigation of carbon dioxide emissions.

The Earth, the City, and the Hidden Narrative of Race (2017) 
Anthony's memoir, The Earth, the City, and the Hidden Narrative of Race, addresses regional equity and climate change.

Publications

Written by Anthony 
 “The Big House and the Slave Quarter, Part I, Prelude to New World Architecture.” Landscape Magazine. Summer 1976.
 “The Big House and the Slave Quarter, Part II African Contributions to the New World.” Landscape Magazine. Autumn 1976.
 “Broadening the Wilderness Movement, African Americans and the Environment," The Wilderness Record. January 1990.
 "The Inner City as Damaged Land.” City Lights Review 4. San Francisco: City Light Books, 1990.
 “Social Justice and the Sustainable City.” First International Ecocity Conference, Proceedings. Ed. Chris Canfield. Berkeley, Ca. May 1990.
 "Protecting Jobs and the Environment in West Berkeley.” Race, Poverty & the Environment/ Urban Habitat Update. Earth Island Institute. April 1991.
 “Energy Policy and Inner City Abandonment.” Race, Poverty & the Environment. Urban Habitat Program, Earth Island Institute. Summer 1991, p. 3.
 "Redefining the California Dream, Growth, Justice and Sustainability." EDGE: The Alliance of Ethnic and Environmental Organizations, San Francisco, 1992.
 "Community Based Approaches to Redevelopment: The Case of West Berkeley.” Hastings West-Northwest Journal of Law and Policy. University of California, Hastings College of Law. Vol. 3, No. 3. Spring 1996.
 "Making Brownfields Bloom." Land and People, Annual Report. Vol. 8, No. 2. Fall 1996.
 “Ecology and Justice in the Global Age: Integrating the Vision.” Terrain Magazine. Winter 1998.
 “The Environmental Justice Movement: A Reflection and a Critique: An Activist’s Perspective.” Power, Justice and the Environment: A Critical Appraisal of the Environmental Justice Movement. Ed. David Pellow. MIT Press, 2005.
 “Reflections on the Purposes and Meanings of African American Environmental History.” To Love the Wind and Rain: Essays in African American Environmental History. Ed. Diane Glave and Mark Stoll. University of Pittsburgh Press, 2005.
 “Remembering Karl Linn, 1923–2005: Landscape Architect and Founder of the Community Design Movement.” Progressive Planning Magazine. Spring 2005.
 “Race, Place and the Humane Metropolis.” The Humane Metropolis: People and Nature in the 21st Century. Ed. Rutherford Platt. University of Massachusetts Press, 2006.
 The Earth, the City, and the Hidden Narrative of Race. New York: New Village Press, 2017.

Mention of Anthony’s work by others 
 Walker, Richard. The Country in the City: The Greening of the San Francisco Bay Area. University of Washington Press, 2007. pp. 229–248.
 Alexander, Christopher. A Pattern Language, Towns, Buildings, Construction. Oxford University Press, 1977. Photographs, pp. 371, 1046.
 Bullard, Robert D., Johnson, Glenn S., and Torres, Angel O., Sprawl. City, Race, Politics, and Planning in Atlanta. Island Press, Washington DC. p. 13.
 Conzen, Michael, P., Rumney, Thomas, and Wynn, Graeme, Editors. A Scholar's Guide to Geographical Writing on the American and Canadian Past. The University of Chicago, 1993. p. 445.
 Di Chiro, Giovanna. “Nature as Community: The Convergence of Environment and Social Justice" in Uncommon Ground: Toward Reinventing Nature, edited by William Cronon, W.W. Norton and Co., 1995. pp. 313, 314.
 Gottlieb, Robert. Environmentalism Unbound: Exploring New Pathways for Change. MIT Press, Cambridge, MA, 2001. pp. 67–68, 69, 278. See also, Urban Habitat pp. 59, 71–73, 314 n.48.
 Gottlieb, Robert. Forcing the Spring, The Transformation of the Environmental Movement. Island Press, 1993. p. 200.
 Grossman, Karl. “Environmental Racism.” The Racial Economy of Science, Toward a Democratic Future. Ed. Sandra Harding. Indiana University Press, 1993. pp. 332, 333.
 Grossman, Karl. “The People of Color Environmental Summit" in Unequal Protection, Environmental Justice and Communities of Color. Ed. Robert Bullard. Sierra Club Books, 1994. p. 291.
 Mowrey, Marc and Redmond, Tim. “Environmental Justice.” Not In Our Backyards: The People and Events That Shaped America's Modern Environmental Movement, William Morrow and Company, 1993. pp. 435–36, 437.
 Snell, Marilyn Berlin. “Karl Linn Cultivates Communities.” Sierra Magazine. May/June, 2001. pp. 30, 31.
 Szasz, Andrew. EcoPopulism, Toxic Waste and the Movement for Environmental Justice, Social Movements, Protest and Contention, Volume 1. University of Minnesota Press, 1994. p. 195.

Boards, Commissions, and Awards 
 2015: Trailblazer Award from the Sierra Club
 2015: UC Davis Community Engagement Award
 2014: Certificate of Special Congressional Recognition by Congresswoman Barbara Lee
 1999–2001: Co-chair, Community Capital Initiative of the Bay Area Alliance for Sustainable Development
 1997: Josephine and Frank Duveneck Humanitarian Award
 1996–1997: President, Board of Directors, Alameda Center for Environmental Technology
 1996: Fellow, John F. Kennedy School of Government, Harvard, university
 1995: San Francisco Foundation, Humanitarian Award
 1995: KQED, Honoree, Black History Month
 1993–1996: Chair and Principal Administrative Officer, East Bay Conversion and Reinvestment Commission
 1993–1995: Founder, President, EDGE, Alliance of Ethnic and Environmental Organizations of California
 1991–1993: President, City of Berkeley, Planning Commission
 1990–1998: President, Earth Island Institute

References

Further reading
 Becher, Anne, and Joseph Richey, American Environmental Leaders: From Colonial Times to the Present (2 vol, 2nd ed. 2008) vol 1 online pp. 29–31.

External links 
 
 http://breakthroughcommunities.info/
 https://web.archive.org/web/20161230163346/http://www.earthcityrace.net/p/welcome.html
 http://www.earthisland.org/

African-American architects
1939 births
American urban planners
American non-fiction writers
African-American writers
Columbia Graduate School of Architecture, Planning and Preservation alumni
Living people
African-American activists
Writers about activism and social change
21st-century African-American people
20th-century African-American people